"Fear Loves This Place" is a song by English singer-songwriter Julian Cope. It was the only single released in support of his album Jehovahkill.

Charts

References

1992 singles
1992 songs
Island Records singles
Julian Cope songs
Songs written by Julian Cope